Brookside Dairy Limited, often referred to as Brookside Dairies, is a dairy processing company in Kenya, the largest economy in the East African Community. The company offers fresh pasteurized milk, cream, butter, yogurt, ghee, and long life milk products in Indian Ocean Islands, East Africa, Rwanda and Burundi. It provides products through distribution depots, agents, and sub agents to outlets in East Africa.

Location
The coordinates of the company headquarters are:1°10'42.0"S, 36°57'30.0"E (Latitude:-1.178333; Longitude:36.958333).

Overview
Brookside Dairies is the largest milk processing company in Kenya, where it controls 45 percent of the dairy market, as at January 2016. The company's products, including fresh and powdered milk, yogurt and butter, are distributed in the East African countries of Kenya, Tanzania, and Uganda.

History
Brookside Dairies was established in 1993 by members of the Jomo Kenyatta Family, including his son Uhuru Kenyatta, who was elected President of Kenya in 2013. In 2009, the Gulf-area-based private equity firm Abraaj Capital paid US$18.7 million for 10 percent shareholding in the business. In 2014, French yogurt maker Danone paid an undisclosed sum to acquire a 40 percent stake in Brookside. Beginning in 2013, Brookside has expanded by buying stakes in rival milk processing plants in Kenya, Uganda. Ethiopia and Nigeria.

Branches
, Brookside Dairies maintained offices at the following locations:

 Ruiru Office (Main Office) - Ruiru, Kenya
 Kampala Office - Kampala, Uganda
 Arusha Office - Arusha, Tanzania
 Mwanza Office - Mwanza, Tanzania
 Dar es Salaam Office - Dar es Salaam, Tanzania

Ownership
Brookside Dairies is a limited liability company, registered in Kenya. , the shareholding in the company stock was as depicted in the table below:

Recent developments
In May 2015, Brookside Dairies paid KSh3.5 billion (about US$40 million) for 51 percent shareholding in Sameer Agriculture & Livestock Limited (SALL), a dairy processing company in neighboring Uganda, in which the Ugandan government maintains a 49 percent shareholding. That business rebranded to 
Brookside Dairy Uganda Limited. In January 2016, the Kenyan press reported that the company had plans to expand to West Africa, starting with Nigeria.

See also
NCBA Group Plc
Dairy industry in Uganda
List of milk processing companies in Uganda
List of wealthiest people in Kenya

References

External links
 Danone Buys Kenyan Dairy Firm Stake To Add To African Markets
 Danone business Brookside Dairy acquires Ugandan dairy SALL: Reports As of 1 June 2015.

Food and drink companies established in 1993
Food and drink companies of Kenya
Manufacturing companies of Kenya
Kenyan companies established in 1992